Tikøb is a small town and parish located 8 km west of Helsingør and six km north of Fredensborg, between Lake Esrum to the southwest and Gurre Lake to the east. in Helsingør Municipality, some 40 km north of Copenhagen, Denmark.

History
Tikøb was probably founded during the late Viking period. The name is first documented as Tiwithcop in Esrom Abbey's Book of Letters (Esrum Klosters Brevbog) in 1170. It is believed that that name means "acquired land in/by the forest dedicated to the Gods". The sparsely populated  was the largest parish on Zealand and one of the largest in Denmark.

The village was originally located on three sides of a small lake.  For centuries the village consisted of six farms, one of which was the rectory, a few other houses, an inn and a forge. The first school in Tikøb, a so-called rytterskole, was built in 1722.

When the new civil parishes (sognekommuner) were established in 1942, Tikøb became the administrative centre of Tikøb–Hornbæk–Hellebæk (later referred to as Tikøb Kommune, "Tikøb Municipality").

The parish had a large population of poor people who were attracted by the opportunity to work in the local forest industry. In 1861, a large social institution Tikøb Workhouse Tikøb Forsørgelses- og Arbejdsanstalt), was built in the outskirts of town, replacing the old poorhouses. It was one of the first institution of its kind in Denmark located outside a market town. The newly established local fire department was also established and based at the same site. A few years later, i 1867, a municipal office (kommunekontor), with daily opening hours, another new feature at the site, opened in the same building complex. From 1877, the institution also had a section for psychiatric patients.

A post office also opened in the 186+s. A windmill was built in 1873, a co-operative dairy opened in 1893 and Tikøb Brugsforening eas founded in 1920. The town was also home to a post office and several other stores.

In the first half of the 20th century, it was increasingly the communities that became the focus of development. In 1954, both the town hall and the retirement home moved to Esperglærde. The old municipal seat in Tikøb was sold to Copenhagen Municipality and used as a retirement home under the name Gyrrelund. The new Hornbækvej had been constructed in the 1930s as an eastern bypass. Tikøb Lake dried out in the 1950s and together with the new road  Harreshøjvej in 1964, this led to the establishment of a new neighbourhood. The 1970 Danish Municipal Reform merged Tikøb Municipality with Helsingør Municipality.

Description
Tikøb Church was probably built by monk from Esrum Abbey. The nave and chancel date from the end of the 12th century. Gurrelund, the former municipal seat, retirement home and fire station, has been converted into a complex with 16 apartments. It has a 30,000 square metre park. Tikøb's old school from 1722 is located at Præstegaardsvej 11. It remained in use until 1912 when the new Tikøb School was built.

Two of the original farms, Stengaard samt Søgaard )now called Møllegård), are still found in their original location. Two have been moved to locations outside the village, one has been dissolved and the rectory burned in 1939.

Notable people
Notable people that were born or lived in Tikøb include:
 Valdemar IV of Denmark (1320 in Tikøb – 1375) was king of Denmark from 1340 to 1375.
 Christopher, Duke of Lolland (1341 in Tikøb – 1363), Duke of Lolland, was the son of King Valdemar IV of Denmark
 Ludvig Munthe (1593 in Tikøb – 1649), Bishop of Bjørgvin (Bergen)
 Jacob Andersen (1892 in Tikøb - 1955) a sailor, competed at the 1928 Summer Olympics
 Jan Grarup (born 1968 in Kvistgaard, near Tikøb) a Danish photojournalist

See also
Esbønderup

References

Helsingør Municipality